Orders and medals were awarded in the Federal Republic of Yugoslavia (and later Serbia and Montenegro) between 1998 and 2006. Before the 1992 Breakup of Yugoslavia, the Orders and medals of the Socialist Federal Republic of Yugoslavia were awarded. Some of the old pre-1992 SFRY orders and medals were retained by FR Yugoslavia, while some new were established. Orders and medals of FR Yugoslavia were regulated by the Law on Decorations of Federal Republic of Yugoslavia adopted on 4 December 1998. Between 1992 and 1998, no decorations were awarded in FR Yugoslavia.

All decorations were divided into four grades: orders, higher decorations, medals and commemorative medals.

Orders

Higher decorations

Medals

See also
Orders, decorations, and medals of the Socialist Federal Republic of Yugoslavia
State decoration

References

External links
Orders and medals of Federal Republic of Yugoslavia
Cintas de condecoraciones (www.coleccionesmilitares.com): REPÚBLICA FEDERAL DE YUGOSLAVIA
Vreme: Zakon o odlikovanjima - Kako se postaje narodni heroj?, 24 April 1999